The High Value engine family from General Motors is a group of cam-in-block or "overhead valve" V6 engines. These engines (aside from the LX9) are the first cam in block engines to implement variable valve timing, and won the 2006 Breakthrough Award from Popular Mechanics for this innovation. For the 2007 model year, the 3900 engine features optional displacement on demand or "Active Fuel Management" which deactivates a bank of cylinders under light load to increase highway fuel economy. It was rumored GM would produce a 3-valve design, but that never came to be. These engines were produced primarily at the GM factory in Tonawanda, New York and at the Ramos Arizpe engine plant in Mexico. The assembly line for this engine was manufactured by Hirata Corporation at their powertrain facility in Kumamoto, Japan.

As of the 2012 model year, GM no longer sells these motors in any US market vehicles.

3.5
These engines should not be confused with the 3.5L DOHC LX5 (Shortstar) V6 engine.

LX9
The LX9 3500 is an OHV engine based on the 3400 V6. It incorporates electronic throttle control. A GM Press Release for the 2004 Malibu described the 3500 thus: "3.5L V6, will debut in the 2004 Chevrolet Malibu. The engine offers improved performance and fuel efficiency, and runs smoother and quieter than earlier generation V6 engines. The 3500 V6 features an advanced powertrain control module, improved fuel injection system, a redesigned exhaust manifold and a new catalytic converter contribute to reduced emissions, as well as improved efficiency and performance characteristics. Improvements in cooling, sealing and the accessory drive system add to the engine's overall quality, reliability and durability."

It was used in the following vehicles and model years:
 2005–2006 Buick Terraza/Chevrolet Uplander/Pontiac Montana SV6/Saturn Relay
 2004–2006 Chevrolet Malibu/Chevrolet Malibu Maxx
 2005–2006 Pontiac G6 Sedan / Coupe
 2006–2007 Buick Rendezvous
 2006 Pontiac G6 GT Convertible

LZ4

The LZ4 3500 is an OHV engine that uses a similar block as the 3.9L LZ9 V6 . It was introduced for the 2006 model year Impala and Monte Carlo. It includes continuously variable cam timing (fixed overlap). It has a cast iron block and aluminum heads. The Chevrolet Malibu, Pontiac G6, and Saturn Aura became equipped with this engine for 2007 (previously the Malibu and G6 had the non-VVT  3.5 L LX9).

Applications:
 2006–2009 Chevrolet Impala
 2006–2007 Chevrolet Monte Carlo
 2007–2010 Chevrolet Malibu/Chevrolet Malibu Maxx
 2007–2009 Saturn Aura
 2007–2009 Pontiac G6
 2008–2009 Saturn Vue XE AWD (/)

Note: GM often refers to this engine in its literature as a "3.5L V6 with Variable Valve Timing".

LZE
The LZE 3500 is an OHV flexible fuel engine based on the 3.5L LZ4 V6 (it can use either plain gasoline or 15% Gasoline and 85% Ethanol, E85) and includes continuously variable cam timing (fixed overlap). It has a cast iron block and aluminum heads.

Applications:
 2006–2011 Chevrolet Impala
 2006–2007 Chevrolet Monte Carlo
 2009-2010 Chevrolet Malibu
 2009-2010 Pontiac G6

3.9

LZ9
The LZ9 3900 has roller rocker arms, a variable length intake manifold, and Variable Cam Timing, a novelty on a pushrod engine. A computer-controlled plenum divider, along with the VVT cam function, improves efficiency across a broader RPM range.

It produces  and  torque, with a wide torque curve. 90% of the torque is available from 1500 rpm to 5500 rpm.

Applications:
 2006 Pontiac G6 GTP Sedan / Coupe / Convertible
 2007 Pontiac G6 GT Sport Package Sedan / Coupe
 2007–2009 Pontiac G6 GT Sport Package Convertible
 2006–2007 Chevrolet Malibu SS
 2006–2011 Chevrolet Impala/Monte Carlo (/ 06 only)
 2006–2009 Buick Terraza/Chevrolet Uplander/Pontiac Montana SV6/Saturn Relay
 2009–2011 Buick Lucerne ( ( in California-emissions states))

LZ8
The LZ8 3900 has the same Variable Cam Timing technology as the LZ9. The 2007 model year introduces the Active Fuel Management system (formerly known as Displacement on Demand), which can turn off a bank of cylinders under a light load for increased fuel economy.

This engine is used in the following vehicles:

 2007–2008 Chevrolet Impala

LGD

The LGD 3900 is a flexible fuel version of the 3.9L, and like its 3.5 L LZE counterpart, it can run on E85, pure gasoline, or any mixture of the two. This is the last ever version of the 3900 V6. The LGD is not available with Active Fuel Management. Output is slightly reduced at 230 horsepower at 5,700 rpm and 235 ft/lbs of torque at 3,200 rpm.

 2007–2009 Buick Terraza/Chevrolet Uplander/Pontiac Montana SV6
 2009–2011 Buick Lucerne/Chevrolet Impala
 2007 Saturn Relay (fleet only)

LZG

The LZG 3900 is a flexible fuel version of the LZ8 that replaces the LZ8 in the Chevrolet Impala.
 2008 Chevrolet Impala

See also
 GM 60-Degree V6 engine Technological ancestor of the GM High Value V6.
 List of GM engines
 GM High Feature engine

References

External links
 GM Powertrain website

High Value
V6 engines
Gasoline engines by model